Erik Hayser (born December 13, 1980, in Santiago de Querétaro, Querétaro, Mexico), is a Mexican actor, writer and producer. He studied acting at the "Centro de Formación actoral" (CEFAC). He is internationally recognized due to role of Diego Nava Martinez in the Mexican political drama Ingobernable. He began his acting career in TV Azteca telenovelas.

Filmography

Film roles

Television roles 

Mexican male telenovela actors
Living people
1980 births
21st-century Mexican male actors
Male actors from Querétaro
Mexican people of German descent

Theater 
Departamento de solteros (2002)
Encuentros (2007–08)
El hombre perfecto (2007–09)

References

External links